Västra Tommarp is a locality situated in Trelleborg Municipality, Skåne County, Sweden with 214 inhabitants in 2010.

References 

Populated places in Trelleborg Municipality
Populated places in Skåne County